The voters of the U.S. state of Ohio elect a state auditor for a four-year term.

Notes

References

Auditor

State auditor elections in the United States by state